Samson (died 5 May 1112) was a medieval English clergyman who was Bishop of Worcester from 1096 to 1112.

Life

Samson was a Royal Chaplain and a canon and Treasurer of the diocese of Bayeux.

In the Domesday Book Samson is referred to as the chaplain and is recorded as holding St. Peter's Collegiate Church, Wolverhampton and considerable properties in southern Staffordshire, most of which he sublet to either the canons of St. Peter's or to other clergy.

In 1096 Samson was elected Bishop of Worcester; he was ordained as a deacon and priest on 7 June 1096 and consecrated as bishop on 8 June 1096. Being a bishop did not prevent him from fathering a daughter, Isabelle of Douvres, and two sons who also became bishops. His son Richard was Bishop of Bayeux from 1108 to 1133, and his son Thomas was Archbishop of York from 1108 to 1114. 

Samson's daughter, Isabelle of Douvres was known for her liaison with Robert, 1st Earl of Gloucester. Their illegitimate son was Richard, who was Bishop of Bayeux from 1135 to 1142. 

It has been suggested that Samson may possibly have been the scribe who oversaw the compilation of Domesday Book by the historian V. H. Galbraith.

Samson died on 5 May 1112.

Citations

References

 British History Online Bishops of Worcester accessed on 3 November 2007

Further reading

 

Anglo-Normans
Bishops of Worcester
1112 deaths
11th-century English Roman Catholic bishops
12th-century English Roman Catholic bishops
Domesday Book
Year of birth unknown
Burials at Worcester Cathedral